The India cricket team toured the West Indies during the 1961–62 season to play a five-match Test series against the West Indies. The tour also included four tour matches against the West Indies' first-class sides. The West Indies won the Test series 5–0. In the total of 12 games that India played, they won two, lost six and drew four.

Touring party 
Nari Contractor, who was leading the India side during England's 1961–62 Asia tour, was again named captain on 11 January 1962 for the tour of the Caribbean by the BCCI. The squad was announced on 16 January. Ghulam Ahmed was named the tour manager.

The team members were:
 Nari Contractor, Gujarat, captain & opening batsman
 Mansoor Ali Khan Pataudi, Delhi, vice-captain & batsman
 Chandu Borde, Baroda, batsman & leg-spin bowler
 Ramakant Desai, Bombay, right-arm fast-medium bowler
 Salim Durani, Rajasthan, batsman & left-arm spin bowler
 Farokh Engineer, Bombay, batsman & wicket-keeper
 ML Jaisimha, Hyderabad, batsman & right-arm medium-pace bowler
 Budhi Kunderan, Railways, batsman & wicket-keeper
 Vijay Manjrekar, Rajasthan, batsman
 Vijay Mehra, Railways, opening batsman
 Bapu Nadkarni, Bombay, batsman & left-arm spin bowler
 EAS Prasanna, Mysore, off-break bowler
 Vasant Ranjane, Maharashtra, right-arm fast-medium bowler
 Dilip Sardesai, Bombay, opening batsman
 Rusi Surti, Gujarat, batsman & left-arm medium-pace bowler
 Polly Umrigar, Bombay, batsman and off-break bowler

Tour matches

Two-day: Trinidad Colts v Indians

Four-day: Barbados v Indians

One-day: Tobago v Indians

Test matches

1st Test

2nd Test

3rd Test

4th Test

5th Test

References

External links
 Tour home at ESPN Cricinfo
 

1962 in Indian cricket
1962 in West Indian cricket
Indian cricket tours of the West Indies
International cricket competitions from 1960–61 to 1970
West Indian cricket seasons from 1945–46 to 1969–70